Stansbury is a surname. Notable people with the surname include:

 Ele Stansbury (1861–1929), American politician
 Elijah Stansbury Jr. (1791–1883), American politician and soldier
 Howard Stansbury (1806–1863), U.S. Army Corps of Topographical Engineers officer, and leader of the Stansbury Expedition to Utah in 1851
 Jack Stansbury (1885–1970), American baseball player
 John Stansbury (1788–1814), American naval officer
 Melanie Stansbury (born 1979), American politician and scientist 
 Rick Stansbury (born 1959), American college basketball coach
 Terence Stansbury (born 1961), American basketball player
 Tiffany Stansbury (born 1983), American basketball player
 Timothy Stansbury, New York City teenager shot dead by a police officer in 2004
 Todd Stansbury, Canadian–American athlete and university sports administrator
 William B. Stansbury (1923–1985), mayor of Louisville, Kentucky, US

Fictional characters
 Cheryl Stansbury, fictional character on the ABC soap opera General Hospital

See also
 Stanbury (surname)